DayStar Adventist Academy is a private boarding high school located in Castle Valley, Utah. It is affiliated with (but not owned or operated by) the Seventh-Day Adventist Church. It is a part of the Seventh-day Adventist education system, the world's second largest Christian school system.

History
DayStar Adventist Academy began as Castle Valley Institute. DayStar began in 1970 when two doctors in Salt Lake City saw the need for an academy in the Nevada-Utah Conference. Today, DayStar has 320 acres. The academy operates Castle Valley Farms, one of the largest self-supporting farms in the country, and offers a variety of life skill courses, agriculture being just one of many. These technical and occupational classes give students ideas for their future careers. The school is located in Castle Valley, a green desert oasis nestled between two  red mesas, with the towering 12,000 ft. La Sal Mountains at one end and the Colorado River at the other.

Academics
DayStar Adventist Academy is a private, four-year, coeducational secondary school affiliated with the Seventh-day Adventists church.  As a Christian school, DayStar Adventist Academy admits students of any race to all the rights, privileges, programs and activities generally accorded or made available to the student body. No discrimination is made on the basis of race in administration of educational policies, applications for admission, scholarship or loan programs, athletic or extra-curricular programs.

See also

 List of Seventh-day Adventist secondary schools
 Seventh-day Adventist education

References

External links
 

Adventist secondary schools in the United States
Schools in Grand County, Utah
Boarding schools in Utah
Private high schools in Utah